Bodhimaṇḍa (Sanskrit and Pali) or daochang is a term used in Buddhism meaning the "position of awakening". According to Haribhadra, it is "a place used as a seat, where the essence of enlightenment is present".

Bodhimaṇḍas are regularly visited by Buddhist pilgrims, and some have gone on to become popular secular tourist destinations as well. In many forms of Buddhism, it is believed that bodhimaṇḍas are spiritually pure places, or otherwise conducive to meditation and enlightenment.

Famous bodhimaṇḍas in India
 The Vajrasana, Bodh Gaya: Gautama Buddha
 Mount Potalaka: Avalokiteśvara Bodhisattva

Famous bodhimaṇḍas in China
 Mount Putuo: Avalokiteśvara Bodhisattva
 Mount Emei: Samantabhadra Bodhisattva
 Mount Wutai: Mañjuśrī Bodhisattva
 Mount Jiuhua: Kṣitigarbha Bodhisattva

See also
Dojo and dojang, two types of buildings whose names are written with the same Chinese characters used for daochang

References

Buddhist philosophical concepts